An ostrich is a type of large flightless bird.

Ostrich may also refer to:

Animals
 Common ostrich (Struthio camelus), the more widespread of the two living species of ostrich
 Ostrich dinosaur or Ornithomimosauria, a group of bird-like dinosaurs
 Ostrich foot shell, any of the molluscs in the genus Struthiolaria

Plants
 Ostrich fern (Matteuccia struthiopteris)
 Ostrich plume or red ginger (Alpinia purpurata)

Entertainment
 Ostrich (album), by Crack the Sky, 2012
 An Ostrich Told Me the World Is Fake and I Think I Believe It, a 2021 stop-motion animated short film
 Ossie Ostrich, Australian television show puppet
 "The Ostrich", novelty single by Lou Reed
 Ostrich GT, a record label founded by Jack Straker of Beachbuggy

Science and technology

Journals
 Ostrich (journal), a journal of African ornithology

Ships
 HMS Ostrich, more than one ship of the British Royal Navy
 USS Ostrich, more than one United States Navy ship

Technical principles
 Ostrich algorithm, computer science terminology
 Ostrich effect, behavioural finance terminology
 Ostrich strategy, economics terminology

Other
 Ostrich guitar, an unconventional guitar tuning scheme
 Ostrich leather
 Ostrich Media, a British company
 Ostrich people, the Vadoma or Wadoma people from the west of Zimbabwe, many of whom have only two large toes like an ostrich